The LORAN-C transmitter Jan Mayen was a LORAN-C transmission facility on the island of Jan Mayen at . The LORAN-C transmitter Jan Mayen used as an antenna had a 190-metre tall (625 ft) guyed mast.

This mast was built as a replacement of a 190.5 metre tall mast, which collapsed in a storm on 8 October, 1980 as the result of low tension on the guy-wires.  The guy-wires were adjusted by personnel from the USCG who mixed up pounds and kilograms. 

Both transmitters on Jan Mayen, together with the other Norwegian LORAN-C transmitters at Bø, and those at Eiði in the Danish Faroe Islands, were shut off at midnight on 31 December, 2015.

The transmitter was demolished in 2017.

See also 
 List of masts

References

External links 
 

Transmitter sites in Norway
Jan Mayen
LORAN-C transmitters in Norway